The 2017 WD-40 Phillip Island 500 was a motor racing event for the Supercars Championship, held on the weekend of 22 to 23 April 2017. The event was held at the Phillip Island Grand Prix Circuit on Phillip Island, Victoria, and consisted of two races, both 250 kilometres in length. It is the 3rd event of fourteen in the 2017 Supercars Championship and hosted Races 5 and 6 of the season.

References 

Phillip Island 500
Phillip Island 500